The 87th District of the Iowa House of Representatives in the state of Iowa.

Current elected officials
Dennis Cohoon is the representative currently representing the district.

Past representatives
The district has previously been represented by:
 George N. Pierson, 1971–1973
 Floyd H. Millen, 1973–1981
 William R. Sullivan, 1981–1983
 Joyce Lonergan, 1983–1987
 Teresa Garman, 1987–1993
 Bill Royer, 1993–1995
 Effie Boggess, 1995–2003
 Tom Sands, 2003–2013
 Dennis Cohoon, 2013–present

References

087